Lewis "Lew" Calvin DeWitt Jr. (March 12, 1938 – August 15, 1990) was an American country music singer, guitarist, and composer. He was a founding member of The Statler Brothers and the group's original tenor.

Biography
For most of his career, DeWitt sang tenor for The Statler Brothers. Songs he wrote for the group include "Flowers on the Wall"— which was a greatest hit during the late 1960s and early 1970s that made the group popular — "Things," "Since Then," "Thank You World," "The Strand," "The Movies," and "Chet Atkins' Hand." In 1968, while the group was under contract to Columbia Records, DeWitt recorded a solo single composed of the songs "She Went a Little Bit Farther" and "Brown Eyes" (the latter was penned by DeWitt).

In November 1981, DeWitt took a leave of absence from The Statler Brothers due to surgery and treatment for Crohn's disease, from which he had suffered since adolescence. At his suggestion, Jimmy Fortune was tapped as his temporary replacement. He  rejoined the group in June of the following year (with Fortune having been offered a permanent position in the group's backing band), but this arrangement lasted less than a week. DeWitt officially retired that same month with Fortune becoming his permanent replacement.

Three years later, DeWitt, feeling that his health had gradually improved through continued treatment, decided to pursue a solo career. During this time, he  returned to touring and  released two albums, Here to Stay (1984) and On My Own (1985). The latter album gave Dewitt his only solo chart appearance with a cover of "You'll Never Know", which made it to number 77. Despite the lack of success, he  remained with the Compleat label through 1987.

DeWitt was married three times. From 1961 through 1973, he was married to Glenda Kay Simmers, with whom he had two sons and two daughters. He was later married to Joyce Anne Arehart, and then Judy Fitzgerald Wells.

DeWitt remained active as a performer until late 1989, when his health rapidly declined, which culminated in his death on August 15, 1990, in Waynesboro, Virginia. The cause of death was heart and kidney disease, stemming from complications of Crohn's. Lew Dewitt Boulevard in Waynesboro was named in his honor in 1992.

In 2008, DeWitt was inducted into the Country Music Hall of Fame as a member of The Statler Brothers.

In 2011, amateur video of DeWitt performing at the Burley Tobacco Festival in the late 1980s surfaced and was posted onto YouTube. The set is notable for the inclusion of what became his final single, "Moonset".

, none of DeWitt's solo recordings has been released in any digital format, although some of them can be found on YouTube.

Discography

Albums

Singles

Notes 
1."Welcome to the Holiday Inn" was previously released on the On My Own album.

References

Further reading

External links
 

1938 births
1990 deaths
American country singer-songwriters
American male singer-songwriters
American tenors
People from Roanoke, Virginia
People from Staunton, Virginia
American people of Dutch descent
Deaths from kidney failure
Deaths from Crohn's disease
The Statler Brothers members
Country musicians from Virginia
Country Music Hall of Fame inductees
Members of the Country Music Association
20th-century American singers
Grammy Award winners
Singer-songwriters from Virginia
20th-century American male singers